Brenda Landwehr (born March 8, 1955) is a Republican member of the Kansas House of Representatives. She is the owner of LT Care Solutions, Inc., and is a member of Christ the King Church, Comcare Mental Health Advisory Board, and the Salvation Army Foster Care Advisory Board.

Career 
Landwehr was originally elected in the 91st district in 1994, serving from 1995 to the end of the 2012 legislative session. On October 25, 2011, Landwehr announced that she would not run for reelection to the Kansas House, but would instead be seeking the Kansas Senate seat in District 25 (then held by incumbent Republican Senator Jean Schodorf) in the 2012 election. She lost her state senate bid, and then ran and lost a bid for District 92's Kansas House seat in 2014. In 2016, Landwehr was elected to the District 105 seat in the Kansas House.

Committee membership
 Health and Human Services (Chair)
 Government Efficiency and Fiscal Oversight
 Joint Committee on Health Policy Oversight (Vice-chair)
 Joint Committee on Home and Community Based Services Oversight

References

External links
 Official Website
 Kansas Legislature - Brenda Landwehr

Republican Party members of the Kansas House of Representatives
Living people
Women state legislators in Kansas
20th-century American politicians
20th-century American women politicians
21st-century American women politicians
21st-century American politicians
People from Wichita, Kansas
Conservatism in the United States
1955 births